Nigerose, also known as sakebiose, is an unfermentable sugar obtained by partial hydrolysis of nigeran, a polysaccharide found in black mold, but is also readily extracted from the dextrans found in rice molds and many other fermenting microorganisms, such as L. mesenteroides. It is a disaccharide made of two glucose residues, connected with a 1->3 link. It is a product of the caramelization of glucose.

References

Disaccharides